Appleton is a heavily eroded lunar impact crater that lies in the northern hemisphere on the far side of the Moon. To the northwest are the craters Von Neumann and Campbel. The smaller Golovin lies to the northeast, while further to the southwest is the Mare Moscoviense.

The crater wall and interior have been heavily eroded by many subsequent impacts, leaving the features rounded and irregular. A pair of craters lie across the southwestern rim, and two small craterlets lie along the eastern rim. The interior floor is irregular and contains many tiny craterlets.

Appleton lies between a pair of satellite craters that are located on opposite sides of the rim, forming a triple formation. Appleton R is located just to the west-southwest, and contains another crater just inside its north rim. On the opposite side of Appleton is Appleton D, a comparably sized formation to Appleton R.

Satellite craters
By convention these features are identified on lunar maps by placing the letter on the side of the crater midpoint that is closest to Appleton.

References

External links
 

Impact craters on the Moon